Finnur Tómas Pálmason (born 12 February 2001) is an Icelandic professional footballer who plays as a defender for KR.

Career 
A youth product of KR, Finnur Tómas moved to Norrköping in Sweden on 13 January 2021. Finnur Tómas made his professional debut with Norrköping in a 1–1 Svenska Cupen win over IFK Göteborg on 7 March 2021. He went back on loan to KR in 2021 and joined them again permanently in January 2022.

International career
Finnur Tómas is a youth international for Iceland, and was called up to represent the Iceland U21s at the 2021 UEFA European Under-21 Championship.

Honours
KR
Úrvalsdeild: 2019
League Cup: 2019
Icelandic Men's Football Super Cup: 2020
Reykjavik Tournament: 2019, 2020

References

External links
 
 
 Sport.de Profile

2001 births
Living people
Finnur Tomas Palmason
Finnur Tomas Palmason
Finnur Tomas Palmason
Association football defenders
Finnur Tomas Palmason
IFK Norrköping players
Finnur Tomas Palmason
Finnur Tomas Palmason
Finnur Tomas Palmason
Finnur Tomas Palmason
Expatriate footballers in Sweden